The Mooney M20 is a family of piston-powered, four-seat, propeller-driven, general aviation aircraft, all featuring low wings and tricycle gear, manufactured by the Mooney International Corporation.

The M20 was the 20th design from Al Mooney, and his most successful. The series has been produced in many variations over the last 60 years, from the wooden-wing M20 and M20A models of 1955, to the M20V Acclaim Ultra that debuted in 2016. More than 11,000 aircraft in total have been produced across three production runs, with the most recent concluding in 2019.

In November 2008, the company announced that it was halting all production as a result of the late-2000s recession, but would still provide parts and support for the existing fleet. With the injection of Chinese capital after the company's purchase, production of the M20 resumed in February 2014. Since then, the company has released two more M20 models.

Development
Al Mooney had been developing preliminary designs for the four-seater M20 for some time, while the single-seat M-18 Mite was in production in the late 1940s and early 1950s. When in early 1953 the company moved from Wichita, Kansas, to Kerrville, Texas, and when it became clear that the Mite was nearing the end of its production, development of the M20 accelerated. The first M20 flight took place on September 3, 1953, and it was certified on August 24, 1955.

During 1955, the company sold 10 of the M20 airplanes. Due to start-up costs, they lost about $3000 on each airplane. In 1956, they delivered 51 airplanes, and in 1957 the total was 105. The combination of speed and efficiency was noteworthy. In 1958 the M20A joined the lineup with a larger  Lycoming O-360-A1A engine, and by 1959, this was the only model offered, with a total sales that year of 231 units. This was the first year the company made a profit. The M20A continued production into 1960, when 166 were delivered. These were the last of the Mooneys to have wooden structures in the wings and tail. Early in the model's history, several incidents of wooden tails breaking up in flight occurred due to water damage and the resulting rot. Consequently, most tails have now been replaced with all-metal copies, as required by Mooney Service Bulletin M20-170A and the FAA Airworthiness Directive 86-19-10. Without the possibility of metal fatigue, the wooden wing has an indefinite life expectancy and is considered by some pilots to provide a smoother ride in turbulence.

1960s

In January 1960, the Mooney company convinced Ralph Harmon to leave McDonnell Aircraft in St. Louis, Missouri, and take over management of the engineering efforts. He insisted on replacing the wood in the M20 with aluminum, and the all-metal M20B was completed by the end of 1960, less than a year after his arrival. In 1961, the company sold 222 M20B airplanes. The following year, the M20C was introduced and 336 were sold that year.

In 1963, the M20D was introduced, essentially an M20C with fixed landing gear and a fixed-pitch propeller. This had a slightly lower price than the M20C and was intended as a basic or trainer model which would have lower insurance costs and which would compete with the Piper Cherokee 180. It could be upgraded with retractable landing gear, and in fact, most of them were upgraded over the years. The M20D was produced from 1963 to 1966 with a total production of 161 units. In 1964 the M20E Super 21 was introduced. It was also based on the M20C but with a more powerful  Lycoming fuel-injected engine. The company sold 366 M20E units that year.

In 1965, a new feature was introduced to the M20. It was called "positive control" and was a single-axis autopilot produced by Brittain Industries. It maintained the wings of the airplane in a level position unless a button on the control wheel was depressed for turns and banks. It was a controversial feature, liked by some pilots and disliked by others. Production and sales of the M20 continued to increase. In 1966, a total of 760 units were delivered, including 280 of the M20C Mark 21 planes and 473 of the M20E Super 21s. A new model, the M20F Executive 21, offered more legroom due to a  increase in cabin length which also allowed for a third fuselage side window. This year, the company exceeded $1,000,000 in profits.

The M20G Statesman, a version of the M20F with less-powerful  engine, was released in 1968. It had a larger airframe than the M20C, but the same engine, and as a result was slower. It was not as successful as the M20F and was produced for only three years, from 1968 to 1970, with a total production run of 189 units.

Despite strong sales, Mooney was short of cash. The company went into chapter 7 bankruptcy in early 1969, and was acquired by American Electronics Laboratories and then Butler Aviation International. Sales that year were less than half of the previous year's figures, although a new version of the M20E Chaparral was released with electrically operated flaps and landing gear. Butler Aviation also acquired the troubled Aerostar company and combined it with Mooney in an attempt to save both. The Mooney name was dropped in 1970, as was the M20 designation; the planes were called Aerostars.

1970s

Butler Aviation closed the Mooney plant in early 1971, and it remained closed for more than two years. In October 1973, Mooney was purchased by Republic Steel. Robert Cumming, a general manager at Republic Steel, had owned a Mooney M20F Executive for years and flew it frequently, and wished to put the Mooney M20 back into production. This began in January 1974 with the reintroduction of the M20F Executive. Roy LoPresti, formerly of Grumman American, had been hired as the vice president of engineering. Through the efforts of his engineering group, various improvements were made to the M20 with the goal of increasing its speed, and the M20J was introduced in July 1976. The 201 was a big seller, and a turbocharged version was developed later that year. The next year, 1977, three models were offered: the M20C Ranger, the M20F Executive, and the M20J 201. By 1979, the M20C had been dropped, ending production of the short-body M20.

It was based on the earlier 201 with further improvements. This year, a total of 439 airplanes were delivered—fewer than the top years of the 1960s, but these deliveries resulted in healthy profits. From this point through 1986, the M20J and the turbocharged M20K were the only two models offered.

1980s

General aviation manufacturing experienced a significant downturn starting in 1982. Mooney was affected along with other manufacturers and was forced to downsize through temporary layoffs. Despite the recession, development work continued. The 201 and 231 received more improvements, including significant reductions in cabin noise levels. In 1982, deliveries fell to 218 units, and in 1983 only 154 aircraft were produced. The United States Air Force announced a competition to develop a replacement for the Cessna T-41 trainer, and Mooney immediately began to develop a military trainer based on the 231.

While the company was dealing with the recession, Republic Steel was acquired by the Ling-Temco-Vought corporation and dropped Mooney. The company ended up in the hands of Armand Rivard of Lake Aircraft and Alexandre Couvelair, a Mooney dealer from Paris. Sales continued to fall, totaling 143 in 1984 and 99 in 1985.

It replaced the 231 and achieved its higher speed with the same  engine. It featured a new 28-volt electrical system to power additional equipment and to improve cold-weather starting. The Continental TSIO-360-GB engine in the 231 had required specific pilot training and modified takeoff and climb procedures to operate at acceptable engine temperatures in hot weather. Because of this, the 252 received an intercooled TSIO-360-MB engine. The various improvements were copied to the 201 airframe, and the new 205 model was released in 1987.

This was followed in 1988 by the M20L PFM, powered by a Porsche PFM 3200 engine which had been developed from the 911 Carrera engine. The fuselage was stretched to form the first long-body M20. One new feature on this airplane was the replacement of the throttle, mixture and propeller controls with a single power control; mixture and propeller rotation speed were automatically adjusted based on the setting of this single control. The Mooney PFM did not last, with a total of 41 units having been manufactured in 1988 and 1989. Most M20Ls no longer use this unique engine, as factory support ceased in 2005.

In February 1989, the next M20 model was released: the M20M TLS (Turbocharged Lycoming Sabre). It was powered, as the name hinted, by a turbocharged Lycoming six-cylinder engine that produced  at 2,575 rpm, and it had a three-bladed propeller. The first year, the TLS accounted for 30 of the 143 aircraft delivered, and in 1990, this increased to 61 units. Also in 1989, Mooney released a trainer model based on the M20J. Beech, Cessna, and Piper had all stopped production of trainers throughout the 1980s, and the 201AT was designed to fill this gap. From 1989 to 1992, 20 units were delivered.

1990s

The next Mooney M20 model was the M20J 201, also designated the MSE, released in 1990 (although few were actually delivered prior to 1991). This was a  non-turbocharged model that incorporated many features from the TLS. In early 1991, Mooney decided to offer its Enhanced Flight Screener Trainer model to the general public, given that the Air Force was slow to make a decision on its trainer. It was to have a  Lycoming O-540 engine and would be rated for aerobatics. However, it generated little public interest. The TLS continued production through 1995, and the MSE continued, too, until it was replaced by the M20R Ovation in 1994. Once again, Mooney was offering two models: one offering high speed (the TLS) and the other offering high efficiency.

The M20T Predator, a canopy-equipped version of the basic M20 design powered by a Lycoming AEIO-540 engine, was Mooney's entrant in the USAF Enhanced Flight Screener competition. The prototype, built in 1991, displayed in a tiger-stripe paint scheme. The sole prototype, registered N20XT, was flown in the Experimental – Market Survey category and was still owned by Mooney Aircraft in 2013, although its registration had expired November 30, 2013. The competition for the Enhanced Flight Screener program was finally held in 1992, and the Slingsby T67 Firefly was chosen instead of the Mooney EFS. Sales continued to drop, only reaching 64 units in 1993. The San Antonio location was sold and all operations returned to Kerrville. Development of the M20 continued, however, and the M20R Ovation was released in 1994. It was designed to fill a gap between the normally aspirated MSE and the turbocharged TLS, and it was powered by a  Continental IO-550 engine. Of the 91 Mooney aircraft manufactured in 1995, 54 were Ovations. This model was named Flying's single-engine plane of the year in 1994.

The following year, an upgraded model of the TLS with a more powerful Lycoming TIO-540-AF1B engine, was designated the M20M, but also was referred to as the "Bravo" due to the new B engine. This upgrade was offered to owners of earlier TLS models that had the TIO-540-AF1A engine. Soon after the release of the Bravo, the TKS ice protection system was offered for the Bravo and Ovation models. The M20K Encore was released in 1997, an M20K with more horsepower and a higher gross weight, giving it performance similar to the original M20K. It also had an improved interior and reduced cabin noise levels.

The M20S Eagle, released in 1999, was powered by a  Continental IO-550-G. It was followed in 2001 by the Eagle 2. This model included refinements such as a  standard leather interior. The Eagle 2 also used the same 3 blade propeller as the original versions of the M20R and was produced from 1994 to 1999.

2000s

The M20TN Acclaim was released in 2006, powered by a turbonormalized Continental TSIO-550-G powerplant with twin turbochargers and dual intercoolers. The Acclaim replaced the Mooney M20M Bravo in the company product line.

Mooney laid off 60 employees in June 2008 and cut production, citing a weak economy and sales inhibited by high fuel prices. Later that year, in November, all production was halted.

In July 2008, Mooney signed a memorandum of understanding with Rolls-Royce to develop a version of the M20 that was to have been powered by the Rolls-Royce RR500 TP turboprop powerplant. The project was announced as being a joint "marketing investigation" and "exploration project", but does not appear to have come to fruition.

2010s

More employees were laid off in late 2010. The stated goal was to have fewer than 10 employees at the start of 2011, with these employees providing parts and support to existing aircraft owners while the company searched for new investment. This search ended in late 2013; Chinese investment enabled the company to resume production in early 2014. Later that year, the M10T and the M10J were announced, both to be powered by Continental diesel engines.

Two new models were released in 2016: the M20U Ovation Ultra and the M20V Acclaim Ultra. The M20U was based on the M20R, and its first flight was on June 4, 2016. It was the first M20 to have a pilot-side door. It also featured a composite shell forward fuselage which replaced the traditional aluminum skin. The M20V, which was developed from the M20TN Acclaim, had those features, as well.

The company closed its doors and laid off all staff on November 12, 2019. The company reopened and staff returned to work on December 2, 2019.

Design
With the exception of the earliest models which had wings and tails with wooden frames, M20s are constructed entirely of metal. All are low-wing aircraft, and the wing skin is aluminum. Slotted flaps cover 70% of the trailing edge. Earlier models use a hydraulic hand pump to extend the flaps, while later models have electrically operated flaps. The forward fuselage has a steel-tube cabin structure covered in aluminum skin; the aft portion of the fuselage is of semi-monocoque design. In many places on the skin of the airplane, flush-mounted rivets are used to reduce drag.

The landing gear on the Mooney M20 are made of heat-treated chrome-molybdenum steel. The main landing gear is attached to the main wing spar, while the nose gear is mounted to the tubular steel frame. Stacks of rubber shock discs act as shock absorbers. All models, with the exception of the M20D Master, came with retractable landing gear; on these models, the nose wheel retracts rearwards and the main wheels retract inwards. Early models use a hand-operated lever system to raise and lower the gear. The manually actuated landing gear are raised by unlocking the lever from just below the throttle, which is called a "Johnson Bar" and is named after the Johnson Bar (locomotive), rotating it to the floor, and locking it into a fixture on the floor. Lowering the landing gear require the same operations in opposite order. Al Mooney got his start working as young man for the railroad industry, hence the borrowing of a steam locomotive term for use in describing part of an aircraft. Starting in 1969, electrically operated landing gear became standard.

The Mooney M20 has medium aspect-ratio tapered wings with 1.5 degrees of washout and 5.5 degrees of dihedral. Later models were equipped with stall strips to improve the stall characteristics.

The empennage of the Mooney M20 is easily recognizable by its unique tail fin with a vertical leading edge. (The tail fin looks as though it is "leaning forward", but it is approximately vertical in level flight, depending on trim setting.) The horizontal tailplane, which consists of fixed stabilizers and trailing elevators, has no trim tabs. The entire tail assembly pivots at the rear of the fuselage to provide pitch trim.

All M20s store fuel in two separate "wet wing" tanks, which are located in the inboard sections of each wing. Fuel is driven from the tank to the injectors or carburetor by an engine-driven pump, backed up with an electric boost pump.

For increased power, many M20s also have a ram-air induction system, called the Mooney "Power Boost". For normal operations, the intake air is filtered before it enters the induction system. When ram air is selected, partially unfiltered air enters the induction system with a higher pressure and consequently the manifold pressure increases about a full inch of mercury flying at 7500 feet above mean sea level, giving a greater power output. The turbocharged variants omit this feature, as the turbocharger provides a far greater increase in manifold pressure.

The Mooney M20 series has been produced in three fuselage lengths: the "short-body" (M20 through M20E), "medium-body" (M20F through M20K), and "long-body" (M20L through M20V). Although all M20s have four seats, the fuselage length increase provided more rear passenger legroom, but with a slight performance decrease: for a similar engine and vintage, a long-body plane is 4 to 6 knots slower than the short-body plane.

Operational history
In August 2017, 6,748 Mooney M20 aircraft were registered with US Federal Aviation Administration, 342 with Transport Canada, and 33 in the United Kingdom with the Civil Aviation Authority.

In June and July, 2017, pilot Brian Lloyd flew his Mooney M20K 231 around the world, commemorating Amelia Earhart's attempted circumnavigation which took place 80 years earlier in 1937. Lloyd followed a route similar to the one taken by Earhart.

Variants

Modifications
Mooneys derive their performance from a clean airframe, small cabin cross-section, and drag reducing refinements over the years. Many of these refinements are supplemental type certificate (STC) modifications to the airframe developed by aftermarket businesses. Some of these modifications have been incorporated into the factory production models.

Rocket 305
In 1990, Rocket Engineering Corp. of Spokane, Washington, modified an M20K 231 model by replacing the standard turbocharged  Continental TSIO-360 engine and two-blade propeller with a turbocharged  Continental TSIO-520-NB and a McCauley three-blade propeller. This engine and propeller combination had previously been proven on the twin-engined Cessna 340 and Cessna 414. Marketed as the Rocket 305, this variant delivered a 228-knot speed and 1,600 feet/minute rate of climb. This significantly increased performance, but at the expense of higher fuel consumption.

The 305 Rocket STC represented a  year certification effort, including 1,000 flight test hours. The plane passed all FAA flight test requirements, including spin, flutter, load, cooling, and noise tests. The STC covered both the 231 and 252 M20K variants. While the 231 and 252 had a maximum certified altitude of 24,000 ft (7,300 m) and 28,000 ft (8,500 m), respectively, the engineering goal of the Rocket 305 was certification for a maximum altitude of 31,000 ft (9,500 m). Extending the altitude in the STC was abandoned due to cost/benefit considerations versus the difficulty of demonstrating compliance with the FAA requirements, plus required changes to the supplemental oxygen systems in this unpressurized aircraft. The aircraft will, however, climb at nearly 1,000 ft/min above 24,000 ft (7,300 m). The Rocket conversion was discontinued by Rocket Engineering. The production-version Mooney Acclaim now delivers faster speeds. As Rockets are available in the used market for about one-third the cost of a new Acclaim, it maintains its popularity among a small market niche.

Aircraft on display

The Mooney Super M20E is the aircraft most closely associated with Robin Miller, an Australian female pilot known as the "Sugar Bird Lady" for her work in distributing the polio vaccine across Australia.

Specifications

These are the specifications for the 2016 M20 Acclaim Ultra.

See also

References

Bibliography
 AOPA Air Safety Foundation, Mooney Aircraft Safety Review, AOPA, U.S.A., 1991
 
 
 
 Eric Broumand Nesbit Evans, Dynamics of flight, stability and control McGraw (Chi Migi) 2005
 
 
 
 
 
 
 Professor Munib Kirdoggy Sagpur, Flight Dynamics, East Fremantle AOPA Publishing, 1995

External links

 Mooney Model Chronology (1948–2006)
 The Al Mooney Story: They All Fly Through the Same Air
 FAA aircraft type certificate
 Mooney models

1950s United States civil utility aircraft
Low-wing aircraft
M20
Single-engined tractor aircraft
Aircraft first flown in 1955